Nick Knox (born Nicholas George Stephanoff; March 26, 1953 – June 14, 2018) was an American drummer for the psychobilly band The Cramps. He replaced Miriam Linna in 1977 and left in 1991. Knox was with The Cramps during the peak of their worldwide popularity when they toured Europe extensively in 1986 with the A Date with Elvis tour. He drafted in his cousin, Mike Metoff (aka Ike Knox), during the preceding European tour in 1984. Knox was recognised as the drummer who brought a tightness to the Cramps sound, and stayed longer than any other drummer in the band. Before joining the Cramps, he was a member of protopunk band The Electric Eels.

Later Knox was the "senior advisor" to the Cleveland-based punk band Archie and the Bunkers, and worked closely with the band on their 2017 single on Norton Records.

Knox died of cardiogenic shock on June 15, 2018.

External links
Nick Knox—Find a Grave

References

1953 births
2018 deaths
The Cramps members
American punk rock drummers
American male drummers
American people with disabilities
Musicians with disabilities
20th-century American drummers
20th-century American male musicians
American people of Russian descent